Nico Papatakis (5 July 1918 – 17 December 2010) was an Ethiopian-born Greek filmmaker, who lived in France.

Biography 
Papatakis was born in Addis Ababa, Ethiopia and spent his early years between Ethiopia and Greece. In 1939, he established himself in Paris and worked as an extra in films. Eventually, he owned the famous Parisian club 'La Rose Rouge' where performers included singer Juliette Gréco. He was married to actress Anouk Aimée from 1951 to 1954 and with her he had a daughter, Manuela Papatakis, born in 1951. He was then married to actress Olga Karlatos from 1967 to 1982, with whom he had a son, Serge Papatakis, born in 1967.

In 1957, Papatakis moved to New York City, met John Cassavetes, and became co-producer of Cassavetes' Shadows (1959). In 1963, his first film, Les Abysses, enjoyed a 
"Succès de scandale" and was entered into the 1963 Cannes Film Festival which refused to show it. It was based on Jean Genet's The Slaves. In 1967, he directed another film, Oi Voskoi (The Shepherds in Greek). During the Algerian War, he was active in the Front de Liberation National. He returned to filmmaking in 1987 with a film in Greek, I Photografia (The Photograph). His last movie was Walking a Tightrope (1992). 

He died in Paris on 17 December 2010.

Films 
Gloria mundi (version 2004)
Les Équilibristes (1992), Walking a Tightrope (English title)
I Photographia (1987), La Photo, The Photograph (Australia: festival title)
Gloria mundi (1976)
Oi Voskoi (1967), Les Pâtres du désordre (France), Thanos and Despina (USA), The Shepherds of Calamity (Europe). 
Les Abysses (1963) (as Nico Papatakis)

As actor
 The Red Rose (1951)

References

External links
 
Nikos Papatakis' obituary ; Nico's Bio résumé  

1918 births
2010 deaths
People from Addis Ababa
Greek film directors
French film directors
Greek emigrants to France
Greek expatriates in Ethiopia